The E170/E180 series Toyota Corolla is the eleventh-generation of the Corolla that has been sold internationally since 2013. Two basic front and rear styling treatments are fitted to the E170—a North American version that debuted first—and a more conservative design for all other markets that debuted later in 2013. For the Japanese and Hong Kong markets, the smaller and unrelated E160 model is offered instead; the Japanese version remains compliant with Japanese government dimension regulations. The E170/E180 has an increased wheelbase of 100 mm longer than the previous generation. The E170/E180 derives from the Toyota New MC platform, unlike the E160 based on the B platform.

International E170 version

Asia 
India
The Corolla Altis was available in India from April 2014 in two engine forms, in petrol and diesel engines. The 1.8-litre 2ZR-FE is powered by petrol and the 1.4-litre (1364 cc) D-4D engine with variable Nozzle turbo and intercooler is powered by diesel. It gets 60/40 reclining rear seats, rain-sensing wipers, eight-way power adjustable seat with lumbar support, LED headlamps and 16-inch alloys on the top-end GL and VL variants, with all variants receiving LED tail lamps.

Toyota shutdown the production on 31 March 2020 due to declining sales and did not engineer to meet the Bharat Stage 6 emission standards which came into effect in April. As such, the E210 model would not be introduced to India, making the E170 model as the last Corolla Altis model to be sold in the country.

Indonesia
Indonesia was the first ASEAN country to get the new Corolla Altis, released on 8 January 2014. Unlike the previous generation, it was released with the 1.8-litre Dual VVT-i engine only, the 2.0-litre Dual VVT-i engine was withdrawn due to small sales. Only 2 variants are offered, the 1.8 G manual transmission and the 1.8 V automatic transmission. The Indonesian market Corolla Altis received its facelift on 16 January 2017 with 7 airbags.

Malaysia
In Malaysia, the Corolla Altis was launched in January 2014 and came in three variant forms, the base 1.8 E, the 2.0 G and the range-topping 2.0 V. CVT transmission with seven-speed sports sequential shift were standard across the lineup. In November 2014, the 2.0 G was replaced with the 1.8 G. In December 2016, the facelift model was launched with seven airbags, ABS with EBD and brake assist, vehicle stability control and ISOFIX rear child seat anchors as standard equipment. In September 2017, the range was updated with DVR dash cam, 360-degree Panoramic View Monitor and additional USB ports.

Pakistan
The eleventh generation Corolla was launched in July 2014 in Pakistan. , a total of five trim levels were being sold; XLi 1.3L Manual, GLi 1.3L (with option of both automatic and manual transmission), Altis 1.6L (automatic only), Altis 1.8L and Altis Grande 1.8L. Pakistan is among the few countries in which the 1.3-litre variant is offered.

Corolla XLi and GLi 1.3L (E170) are having 2NZ-FE VVT-i mated with either 5-speed manual or 4-speed automatic transmission, Corolla Altis 1.6L (E171) is having 1ZR-FE Dual VVT-i engine with mated 4-speed automatic transmission, Corolla Altis 1.8L or Altis Grande 1.8L (E172) is having 2ZR-FE Dual VVT-i with the choice of 6-speed manual or 7-speed CVT-i.

Toyota Pakistan upgraded the features of whole Corolla's lineup in April 2016, with the most features being offered in the top spot variant known as Corolla Altis Grande. Some of the features of Altis Grande 1.8L were CVT-i, automatic air conditioning with climate control, immobilizer anti-theft system, jack knife key, WOW meter, sunroof, 16-inches Hyper Black alloy wheels, leather interior with bucket seats, 8-inch Android infotainment system, multimedia steering keys, driver + passenger SRS airbags, auto-fold outdoor rear view mirrors (ORVM), 6:4 rear reclining seats, body colored mud flaps, etc. Toyota Pakistan introduced the facelifted version in August 2017.

Philippines
The Corolla Altis was first released in early 2014, with five trims available. The entry-level 1.6 E model only came with a six-speed manual transmission, four-beam halogen headlamps, fabric upholstery, and 16-inch alloy wheels. The mid-range 1.6 G model added TVSS, fog lights and was available in six-speed manual or seven-speed continuously-variable transmission. The 1.6 V featured a push starter and front bumper sensors, and the high-end 2.0 V added LED headlamps with DRLs, paddle shifters, rain sensing wipers, leather seats, 17-inch alloy wheels, and sport body kit. A minor update for the Altis was later released in December 2016. The higher end variants were now equipped with DRLs and updated safety features such as 7 airbags, ABS and EBD. 1.6 variants were still equipped with halogen headlights, beige interior while the 2.0 variant gained projector HID headlamps, wrap around body kits and leather interior.

Singapore

The new Corolla Altis was available from 10 January 2014 offering only with the 1.6-litre 1ZR-FE engine with Dual VVT-i mated to a 7-speed Sequential transmission with Super CVT-i. Initially offered as a single trim, the line up was split into Classic and Elegance trims with the former using multi-reflector headlamps, 16-inch rims, and the latter adds LED headlamps with DRLs, keyless entry with push button start, powered driver seat, auto-dimming rear view mirror, ionizer for the climate control and 17-inch alloy wheels. In mid 2017, the facelift model was launched, safety features such as seven airbags, ABS with EBD and brake assist, Vehicle Stability Control (VSC) were made standard across all trims. An Eco trim was initially offered during first batch of the facelift period, providing a no-frills option with basic 15” alloy rims, leather seats and without fog lamps. It was subsequently removed from the lineup as more units of the Standard and Elegance variants were available.

Japanese-market E160 models (Axio and Fielder estate) were also available and sold by grey market importers.

Taiwan
The new generation Corolla was marketed as the "Corolla Altis" (used in Southeast Asian markets and some parts of Asia). This generation had an overall redesigned look for the Asian market setting it apart from the American market. The Corolla Altis was only available with a 1.8-litre Dual VVT-i 2ZR-FE engine with variants such as the Classic, 1.8E Deluxe, Elegance and 1.8 Z. In 2015, an additional sportier version was added to the lineup with the Corolla Altis X moniker. Designed and sold exclusively in Taiwan, the model featured a redesigned front bumper heavily influenced by the 2014 North American Camry facelift, a redesigned lower rear bumper, side skirts, clear tail lamps, and spoilers. In October 2016, the facelift model was launched, with Eco, Standard and Elegance trims. Safety features such as seven airbags, ABS with EBD and brake assist, Vehicle Stability Control (VSC) were standard across all trims.

On 21 September 2017, the updated Corolla Altis X was launched, with the similar front bumper design as the updated Chinese market Levin.

Thailand
Thailand continued to manufacture the Corolla, and the new version was launched as the Corolla Altis in a total of seven grades (J, E, G and V), as well as a special edition grade (ESport). Thailand was the only country to offers all existing grades of the new Altis, whilst export markets were only given a fraction of the Thai range in varying combinations.

Unlike most markets in Southeast Asia, CNG powered grades were offered for the 1.6-litre variants of the Corolla Altis. A special edition grade (E Sport) was also offered only in Thailand which comes with an aerodynamic bodykit including a rear spoiler, sport seats and 17-inch multi-spoke alloys.

Grades available for the Corolla Altis in Thailand vary from the basic 1.6J to the high spec 1.8V Navi model.

Australia and New Zealand 
Toyota in Australia and New Zealand launched the E170 series Corolla saloon in late February 2014. An equivalent hatchback model is also retailed under the Corolla nameplate, but this is actually a rebadged E180 Auris released earlier in 2012. For the saloon version, which was imported from Thailand, there were three different variants: the base Ascent, the mid range SX model, and the flagship ZR. The Corolla saloon and hatchback (Auris) were together in 2014 the top selling car in Australia.

Saloon

Hatchback (rebadged E180 Auris)

Facelift 
The facelifted international version of the E170 Corolla was unveiled on 24 March 2016. It features sleeker LED headlamps with new LED light guides, thinner upper grille with a chrome garnish, a full width lower grille that houses the fog lamps. At the rear the chrome strip is thinner and the tail lamps adopt new LED clusters. The facelifted E170 Corolla Altis was launched in Thailand on 21 November 2016, in the Philippines on 8 December 2016, in Malaysia on 9 December 2016, in Indonesia on 16 January 2017, in Singapore in July 2017 and in Pakistan in August 2017.

International E180 version

China 
Toyota would sell two versions of the E180 Corolla in China, the international version, called the FAW-Toyota Corolla, which is similar in appearance to the Corolla Altis, and the Guangqi-Toyota Levin, which sports a design closer to the North American version, but is still a separate design (see below). In October 2015, Toyota introduced the Corolla hybrid variant in China with locally produced hybrid systems. Production for the Corolla E180 commenced in June 2014 for the 2015 model year. Engine and transmission choices available are the 1.6 litre 1ZR-FE and 1.8 litre 2ZR-FE paired with 5 speed manual or continuously variable transmissions. The Levin also shares these engines and transmissions.

In 2017, both versions of the Corolla in China received a facelift and a 1.2-litre 9NR-FTS turbocharged engine. The FAW-Toyota Corolla also had the old 1.6-litre engine as an option but the Levin dropped the 1.6-litre engine. The plug-in hybrid variants of both the Corolla and the Levin are still available for purchase .

South Africa 
In South Africa, the E180 Corolla was launched on 7 February 2014 with a choice of three petrol engines (1.3-, 1.6- and 1.8-litre) and a 1.4-litre D-4D diesel engine. All engines are mated to a standard six-speed manual transmission while a CVT is available for the 1.6- and 1.8-litre variants. Trim levels are the base Esteem, the mid-level Prestige, the sporty Sprinter and the top-of-the-line Exclusive. The facelifted version of the E180 Corolla went on sale on 25 January 2017. The facelifted E180 Corolla retained the pre-facelift model tail lamps for the Esteem trim and the Sprinter trim was discontinued. The E180 Corolla is still currently produced and sold in South Africa as the Corolla Quest, which was revealed on 31 January 2020 and released in March 2020.

Europe 
In February 2014, Toyota introduced the Corolla E180 in Germany, western Europe's largest national automobile market. This marked the return of the "Corolla" badge to Germany after an absence of seven years (although the previous Corolla E150 was sold in some smaller European markets, such as Belgium). The line-up includes a 1.4-litre D-4D turbo-diesel and petrol engines ranging from a 1.33-litre Dual VVT-i engine, a 1.6-litre engine available with Dual VVT-i and Valvematic system, and a new 1.8-litre Dual VVT-i engine.

The 1.8-litre Dual VVT-i petrol engine is fitted as standard with a new Multidrive S automatic transmission. All other engines in the line-up are fitted with six-speed manual transmissions.

North American version (E170) 

The North American Corolla is very similar to the international version, except for offering revised front and rear styling. This design was adopted from the Furia concept. North American models were announced first on June 6, 2013; European models, announced the day after, differed mostly outside with their front-end treatment. The engines were closely related to the previous models, with only slight improvements in performance and emissions. Stylistic elements of this generation of the Corolla were previewed in the Furia concept car shown at the January 2013 Detroit Auto Show.

The eleventh generation Corolla falls under North America's compact car market segment, and it is offered in four grades, L, LE, LE Eco and S. The Corolla is a perennially top-selling model in North America, and the world. Many of the changes in the new model were inherited from Toyota's Furia concept car, with the most striking difference from the previous generation being mostly cosmetic. Toyota focused on fuel efficiency with this new design, while continuing the longstanding trend of increasing size and weight.

The Corolla manufactured in Cambridge, Ontario, Canada has about 25 percent of its parts coming from Japan.

The Corolla will be available with a four-speed automatic, six-speed manual, or Toyota's new CVTi-S Continuously-Variable Transmission.

The brakes are a  ventilated front disc, and a  rear drum with the option of a  solid rear disc on the S trim. It features Toyota's Star Safety System as standard, including Vehicle Stability Control (VSC), Traction Control (TRAC), Anti-lock Braking System (ABS), Electronic Brake-force Distribution (EBD) and Brake Assist. Smart Stop Technology brake override system is also included standard, as well as an electronic tire pressure monitoring system (TPMS).

The standard wheels on the L and LE Eco grades are 15-inch covered steel, with 16-inch wheels on the LE and S. Different 16-inch aluminum alloy wheels are offered on the LE, and LE Eco, and 17-inch alloy wheels are offered on the S. The tire on the LE Eco are low rolling resistance 195/65R-15 rubber. The S 17-inch option offers 215/45R-17 rubber. For the LE, and on the alloy option for the LE Eco model, a 205/55R-16 tire is used.

Toyota's new Corolla offers two engine selections, both all aluminium, 1.8-litre inline four cylinder engines. With the exception of the LE Eco trim, the 1.8-litre engine is equipped with dual Intelligent VVT-i variable valve timing, producing . The LE Eco model has a  engine featuring Toyota's Valvematic option, which improves the Eco model's fuel efficiency. Valvematic offers a broader range of continuously variable valve timing (lift and phasing) over VVT-i, providing more optimal intake valve (not on exhaust side) operation relative to engine demands conferring a five-percent improvement in fuel economy and engine output. The Eco model's engine also has an increased compression ratio of 10.6:1.

The base model Corolla L is offered with a four-speed automatic transmission or a six-speed manual transmission. The six-speed manual is also available in the Corolla S.

Toyota offers a continuously variable transmission on the LE, LE Eco and S trims, named the CVTi-S (Continuously Variable Transmission intelligent-shift). The transmission's software creates discrete sequential shift points to emulate traditional transmissions while accelerating. The S trim offers a manual-mode shift gate in the console shifter, or paddle shifters on the steering wheel allowing sequential "shifts" through 7 speeds. On the LE Eco, the transmission has an ECO driving mode.  

The front suspension uses MacPherson struts with a new, more rigid control-arm design, while the rear uses a torsion beam arrangement. The spring rates on Corolla are relaxed, but the S model equipped with 17-inch wheels includes unique coil, damper, and bushing tuning to offering stiffer handling. The rear torsion beam's attachments points are now fastened to the body at a slanted, diagonal angle for its bushings, a departure from the traditional straight attachment orientation; the new layout contributes improves grip, and stability.

Safety
The Corolla in its most basic Latin American configuration with 3 airbags received 5 stars for adult occupants and 4 stars for toddlers from Latin NCAP in 2014.

The Corolla in its most basic Latin American configuration with 7 airbags received 5 stars for adult occupants, 5 stars for toddlers, and Advanced Award from Latin NCAP in 2017.

Special Edition 
In 2014, for the 2015 model year, Toyota released the Special Edition Corolla based on the S model. It has gloss black-painted 17-inch alloy wheels, red stitching on its black steering wheel, shift knob, door trim, and seats, Special Edition floor mats and trunk emblem. In Canada, this model is called the 50th Anniversary Limited Edition. Absolutely Red, Super White, and Black Sand Pearl are the only exterior colors offered.

Facelift 
In 2016, for the 2017 model year, Toyota released the facelift version of the E170 Corolla with new aerodynamic scoops, (only for 50th anniversary edition) restyled front facia, including new headlight design; redesigned taillights also featured. The interior added a new seven-inch touch screen and four-inch multi-information display. The updated Corolla features the new SE and XSE grades, and new exterior colors.

Toyota Levin (E180) 
In addition to the FAW-Toyota Corolla sold in China that is based on the Corolla Altis, in 2014 Toyota China released the GAC-Toyota Levin. In October 2015, Toyota introduced the Corolla hybrid variant in China with locally produced hybrid systems.

The Levin has different frontal styling compared to both the North American Corolla and the international version. The grille is a slim piece dominated by chrome strip along the top that continues above the headlamps (that have been designed as a cross between the North American Corolla's lights and the international Corolla's wrap-around units). The lower intake is trapezoidal-shaped like the regular (non-sport) grade North American Corolla, but for China features a chrome surround. At the rear, the Levin's lights are based on the North American Corolla—the rear three-quarter panels and bumper are the identical. However, the reshaped trunk lid has the Toyota logo moved upwards to make way for the dominating chrome strip that bridges the tail lamps. The outer portions of the Levin's tail-lamps are the same shape as the Corolla for North America. However, the inner portion that sit upon the trunk lid are resigned. Also, the North American Corolla's tailpipe pokes straight out from underneath the rear bumper; the Levin's tailpipe curves downwards.

The Levin received an update at the Auto Shanghai in April 2017, with the similar front bumper design as the updated Taiwanese market Corolla Altis X.

References

External links 

  (Corolla Quest, South Africa)

Latin NCAP small family cars
170
Cars introduced in 2013
2020s cars
Vehicles with CVT transmission
Hybrid electric cars
Partial zero-emissions vehicles
Motor vehicles manufactured in the United States